The Jagera people, also written Yagarr, Yaggera, and other variants, are the Australian First Nations people who speak the Yuggera language. The Yuggera language which encompasses a number of dialects was spoken by the traditional owners of the territories from Moreton Bay to the base of the Toowoomba ranges including the city of Brisbane.

Language
Yuggera is classified as belonging to the Durubalic subgroup of the Pama–Nyungan languages, but is also treated as the general name for the languages of the Brisbane area. The Australian English word 'yakka' (loosely meaning 'work', as in 'hard yakka') came from the Yuggera language (yaga, 'strenuous work').

According to Tom Petrie, who provided several pages listing words and placenames in the languages spoken in the area of Brisbane (Mianjin), yaggaar was the local word for 'no',  the term for 'no' frequently in aboriginal languages being an ethnonymic marker of difference between various native groups. Mianjin is the spike of land from North Quay to Breakfast Creek, and was also known, as was the tribe there, as Miguntyun.

Ludwig Leichhardt's Diaries 1842-1843 recorded Miguntyun as "Megandsin" as the name for the land holding area from Brisbane CBD to Breakfast Creek, and the people as speaking Yuggera.

Country
Norman Tindale defined the Yugara/Jagara lands as encompassing the area around the Brisbane River from the Cleveland district with its northern extent reaching to the vicinity of Esk. According to Watson, the Jagera-related peoples in the Chepara family group inhabited the territories from Moreton Bay to Toowoomba to the west, nearly to Nanango in the north west, including Brisbane. However, this is disputed by many groups and has resulted in numerous native title claims for the area. It also encompasses Jimna and its surrounding forests, where their traditional lands adjoined those of the Wakka Wakka and the Gubbi Gubbi (also Kabi Kabi or Gabi Gabi). Subgroups of the Chepara have identified with distinct areas. The Yugambeh and the Bundjalung people bordered them on the south.

Native title
Descendents of the both the Yagara and the Turrbal consider themselves traditional custodians of the land over which much of Brisbane is built. Native claim applications were lodged respectively by the Turrbal in 1998 and the Yagara in 2011, and the two separate claims were combined in 2013. An Indigenous land use agreement (ILUA) was signed over the site of the historic 1843 Battle of One Tree Hill, now known as Table Top Mountain, when the warrior Multuggerah from the Ugarapul tribe and a group of men ambushed and won a battle with settlers in the area. The ILUA was signed between Toowoomba City Council and a body representing the "Jagera, Yuggera and Ugarapul ( Ugarapul does not recognise Jaggera as a tribe in Ipswich region they hold no sacred sites. ) people" as the traditional owners of the area, in 2008 .

In January 2015, Justice Christopher Jessup for the Federal Court of Australia rejected the claims on the basis that under traditional law, which was now lacking, none of the claimants would be considered to have such a land right. The decision was appealed before the full bench of the Federal Court, which on 25 July 2017 rejected both appeals and confirming the 2015 decision that native title does not exist in the greater Brisbane area.

Variant names and spellings
 Jagarabal ([jagara = no)
 Jergarbal
 Yagara
 Yaggara
 Yuggara
 Yugg-ari
 Yackarabul
 Turubul (language name)
 Turrbal
 Turrubul
 Turrubal
 Terabul
 Torbul
 Turibul
 Yerongban
 Yeronghan
 Ninghi
 Yerongpan
 Biriin

Place names

 Meebatboogan, Mount Greville, Moogerah Peaks National Park.
 Cooyinnirra, Mount Mitchell, Main Range National Park.
 Booroongapah, Flinders Peak, Flinders Peak Group.
 Ginginbaar, Mount Blaine, Flinders Peak Group.

Notable people
 Multuggerah, 19th-century warrior
 Uncle Desmond Sandy
 Aunty Ruth James
 Aunty Pearl Sandy
 Uncle, Hon. Neville Bonner, former Australian senator, was a Jagera tribal elder.
 Auntie Jeannie Bell, Australian linguist.
 Auntie Faye Carr, 2017 National NAIDOC Awards Winner Female Elder of the Year
 Latia Schefe, 2017 National NAIDOC Awards Winner Youth of the Year
 Susan McCarthy, originally Bunjoey, daughter of Moonpago.

Notes

Citations

Sources

.

Aboriginal peoples of Queensland
Brisbane